Shinkafi is a Local Government Area in Zamfara State of Nigeria. Its headquarters are in the town of Shinkafi an area of about 674mk2 and population of 135,649 (2006 Census). It shares boundaries with Isa Local Government Area (Sokoto State) and Niger Republic from the north, Zurmi Local Government Area to the South and South-East, Maradun Local Government Area and Raba Local Government Area (Sokoto State) by the west. Distance from the State Capital, Gusau is approximately 116 km.

History 
In the early days of 1802 before the Jihad of Usman Danfodio, an Islamic scholar named Mallan Muhammadu Zabo, one of the ancestors of the Borno Empire migrated along the east of the area. He led an entourage in search of green pasture for their flocks. Mallan Zabo was wealthy and took with him many flocks, birds, horses, his wives and children as well as some slaves. It is also evident that the entire entourage that came along with him were part of the Barebari people that settled firstly in a nearby Village called ‘Badarawa’. The entourage later stopped at a valley near a river they named “Tafkin Kaiwa” which they made as their first settlement.

The Katsinawa merchant also found the place a good area for the settlement, the present days Gidan Dankwara. Another group of people came from Kwazare Town of Niger Republic together with their leader called Adagwargo, who belong to Rahazawa ethnic background, the present Gidan Sarkin Ruwa in Barhazawa area.  This entourage also came with their herds and branched to the same valley where they found shelter and water to feed their herds.  As they interacts socially with the first settlers, the Barebari, results to a growing population and the area become convenient for many stop-over traders, who used spend nights for they commercial undertakings. Yet another group of hunters who came around the valley in search of wild animals stars to settle there.

The area developed and became very big, with Mamman as their leader, the ruler of Badarawa, Magaji Bello, decided to come and re-settle in Gonar Mai Saje, (‘Yan Kukoki) where there was abundance of water. The people settled and began to cultivate rice along the valley in large quantity, due to their ability in rice production; the community was named ‘Shinkafi’ from the hausa name of rice - shinkafa. Due to insecurity of the times, Magaji Bello erected a wall (called Ganuwa) around the settlement which was enforced by a circular ditch. The descendants of Magaji Bello are the present Gidan Doka.

The socioeconomic activities of the town defines its international market status attracting traders and merchants from all over the federation and others from the neighboring countries like Niger Republic, Cameroon, Togo, Mali, Benin Republics, Chad as well as Ghana. There also exists some Tobacco leaf buying centres, namely Nigerian Tobacco Company (NTC) and Philp Morris Tobacco Company others were cottage industries.

The disciplined, religious and economic natures of the settlement conglomerate and attracted other settlements from Kamarawa, Shanawa, Badarawa, Isa and Sabon-Birnin Gobir, and such engineered the then Sarkin Gobir of Isa to place keen interest on the settlement – Shinkafi.  The town developed tremendously to become the headquarters of the then Isa Native Authority in the North-West State, Isa Local Government Area in the then Sokoto State and the present Shinkafi Local Government Area of Zamfara State, Nigeria.

The majority of the inhabitants are predominantly Hausas and Fulanis with quite a number of other tribes like Igbos, Yorubas, Tivs and Zabarmawas.  The town now has about 15 Primary Schools, 4 Secondary Schools, a General Hospital and on-going Referral Hospital, 4 Dispensaries, a number of Private Clinics.  It has also pipe borne water system, as well as connected to the national grid, with good road network, Banking Services, Exotic Restaurants etc.

The town leadership used to be District Head from 1835 – 2000, when the First Executive Governor of Zamfara, Sen. Ahmed Sani (Yariman Bakura) upgraded it to an Emirate – Sarkin Gabas of Shinkafi (Second Class Emir).  The rulers from then to-date are as follows:-

1.        Magaji Mamman                                       1835 – 1845;

2.        Magaji Bello                                              1845 – 1859;

3.        Magaji Ibrahim I                                         1859 – 1874;

4.        Magaji Bube                                              1874 – 1889;

5.        Magaji Umaru                                            1889 – 1903;

6.        Magaji Abdu                                              1903 – 1922;

7.        Magaji Ahmadu                                          1922 – 1926;

8.        Magaji Mainasara (Dango)                         1926 – 1939;

9.        Magaji Ahmadu Lamido                              1939 – 1950;

10.      Magaji Ibrahim II                                         1950 – 1990;

11.      Magaji Mohammadu Moyi                           1990 – 1994;

12.      Magaji Mohammadu Makwashe                  1995 – 2000;

13.      Emir Mohammadu Makwashe                     2000 – to date.

The postal code of the area is 883.

Notable people
 Sani Abdullahi Shinkafi, Nigerian politician
 Bello Turji, bandit leader

References
2. History of Shinkafi Town by ShinkafiOnline Facebook page - 2016

MD, Liman (2017), The Contribution of Kulliyatul Arabia Waddirasatul Islamiyyah to the Development of Islamic Education in Shinkafi Local Government Area of Zamfara State.

Local Government Areas in Zamfara State